Brunswick is an unincorporated community in Hanover Township, Lake County, Indiana.

History
Brunswick was founded in the 1850s. The community was named after Brunswick, Germany.

Geography

References

Unincorporated communities in Lake County, Indiana
Unincorporated communities in Indiana
populated places established in the 1850s
1850s establishments in Indiana